Sir Markus Dunajtschik  (born 1935) is a New Zealand businessman, property developer, and philanthropist. With his partner, Dorothy Spotswood, he donated $53 million towards the cost of Wellington's new children's hospital, Te Wao Nui, which was opened in September 2022.

In the 2023 New Year Honours, Dunajtschik was appointed a Knight Companion of the New Zealand Order of Merit, for services to philanthropy.

References

1935 births
Living people
New Zealand businesspeople
New Zealand philanthropists
Knights Companion of the New Zealand Order of Merit
Businesspeople awarded knighthoods